Andy Murray was the two-time defending champion, but decided to participate in Doha instead. 
Lleyton Hewitt won the title, defeating Roger Federer in the final in their 27th and last meeting, 6–1, 4–6, 6–3.

Seeds
The top four seeds receive a bye into the second round.

Draw

Finals

Top half

Bottom half

Qualifying

Seeds

Qualifiers

Lucky loser
  Alex Kuznetsov
  Pierre-Hugues Herbert

Qualifying draw

First qualifier

Second qualifier

Third qualifier

Fourth qualifier

References
 Main Draw
 Qualifying Draw

2014 ATP World Tour
Men's Singles